The Central Bank of Turkmenistan is the national bank of Turkmenistan. It is located in the centre of Ashgabat. It was established in 1991 and regulates the country's banking system and supervises the national financial policy.

It is located in a distinctive high rise building.

Board
The Board of the Central Bank of Turkmenistan consists of an odd number of people. This includes the Governor, who is the Chairman of the Board and several Vice-Chairmen. Gadyrgeldi Müşşikow has been the Governor since 9 July 2021.

Chairmen
Amandurdy Bordzhakov, 1991 - June 1992
Nazar Saparov, June 1992 - June 1993
Hudajberdy Orazov, June 1993 - May 1999
Seitbay Gandimov, May 1999 - May 2002
Imamdurdi Gandimov, May 2002 - September 2002
Nurberdi Bayramov, September 2002
Shekersoltan Mukhammedova, September 2002 - May 2005
Jumaniyaz Annaorazov, May 2005 - May 2006
Geldimyrat Abylov, May 2006 - April 2008
Guvanchmyrat Goklenov, April 2008 - July 2011
Tuvakmamed Japarov, July 2011 - January 2014
Gochmyrad Myradov, January 2014 - January 2015
Merdan Annadurdiyev, January 2015-9 July 2021
Gadyrgeldi Müşşikow, 9 July 2021 – present

Turkmen Horse Day

In 2013, the Central Bank of Turkmenistan has issued a new collection of commemorative coins in honor of the Turkmen Horse Day. The gold and silver coins, called "Akhalteke horse of the Turkmen", have a value of US$18. Ancient Akhal-Teke horses, known as "horses from heaven", are part of the national heritage of Turkmenistan, which is considered an international center of horse grooming.

References

External links
 Central Bank of Turkmenistan official site
 Exterior building

Banks of Turkmenistan
Ashgabat
1991 establishments in Turkmenistan
Banks established in 1991